The Secretary of Commerce and Trade is a member of the Virginia Governor's Cabinet.  The office is currently held by Caren DeWitt Merrick.

List of Secretaries of Commerce

Secretary of Commerce and Resources (July 1, 1972–1986)
 Maurice B. Rowe (1972–1974)
 Earl J. Shiflet (1974–1978)
 Maurice B. Rowe (1978–1982)
 Betty Jane Diener (1982–1986)

Secretary of Economic Development (1986–1993)
 Richard M. Bagley (1986–1988)
 Curry A. Roberts (1988–1990)
  Lawrence H. Framme III (1990–1992)
 Cate Magennis (1992–1993)

Secretary of Commerce and Trade (1993–present)
 Cate Magennis (1993–1994)
 Robert T. Skunda (1994–1997)
 Robert J. Stolle (1997–1998)
 Barry E. DuVal (1998–2001)
 Joshua N. Lief (2001–2002)
 Michael J. Schewel (2002–2006)
 Patrick Gottschalk (2006–2010)
 Jim Cheng (2010–2014)
 Maurice Jones (2014–2016)
 Todd Haymore (2016–2018)
 Esther Lee (2018)
 Brian Ball (2018–2022)
 Caren Merrick (2022-present)

Former Offices Absorbed by the Secretary of Commerce
 Virginia Secretary of Technology (2018)

References

1972 establishments in Virginia
Government agencies established in 1972
Commerce
Commerce